Daniela Traxl-Pintarelli (née Pintarelli; born 10 November 1983) is an Austrian racing cyclist, and team owner. She won the Austrian National Road Race Championships in 2007. She competed in the women's road race at the UCI Road World Championships on seven occasions, between 2006 and 2013.

Major results
Source: 

2007
 1st  Road race, National Road Championships
2008
 National Road Championships
2nd Road race
3rd Time trial
2009
 National Road Championships
2nd Road race
2nd Time trial
2010
 2nd Road race, National Road Championships
2012
 3rd Road race, National Road Championships
2015
 2nd Road race, National Road Championships

References

External links

1983 births
Living people
Austrian female cyclists
People from Landeck District
Sportspeople from Tyrol (state)
21st-century Austrian women